Walter Dickson (22 February, 1916 - 23 March, 1990) was a Swedish author.

Biography
Dickson was born in New Haven in the United States, where his father worked as a carpenter. The family returned to Sweden in 1921 and settled in Vinberg near Falkenberg, where he was raised by his grandparents. Dickson graduated from Halmstad in 1936 and received his bachelor's degree in philosophy from the University of Gothenburg, but he also studied at universities in Uppsala and Stockholm. From 1943 he was a literature reviewer in the daily newspaper Ny Tid and also contributed to several Finnish and Swedish literary magazines and the trade union press.

Dickson made his debut with Perspektiv från Stigberget (1942) and Det gamla huset (1943), both collections of short stories depicting the working-class district of Masthugget in Gothenburg. In his largest work, he wrote a series of novels about his own family and its emigrant fates: Skallgång (1946), Vid havets rand (1948), Storbasens saga (1951), Carmania (1952), Amerika (1954), Oceanisk hemfärd (1955) and Solagömma (1957). Dickson also wrote cultural-historical essays and several books about the landscape of Halland. He was a socialist and in describing older times he is often critical of social ills. Despite this, he appeared in the 1970s in the Centerns Ungdomsförbunds magazine Ung Center.

His narrative style is considered personal and inventive.

Bibliography

 Perspektiv från stigberget 1942
 Det gamla huset 1943
 Störst är kärleken 1945
 Skallgång 1946
 Hammare och sälgpipa 1947
 Vid havets rand 1948
 Det eldröda landskapet 1948
 Masker och en klippa 1949
 Händerna 1950
 Storbasens saga 1951
Carmania (1952)
 Hjärtfäste och hungertorn 1953
 Mitt Halland 1953
 Det vidgade jaget 1953
 Amerika 1954
 Oceanisk hemfärd 1955
 En livslivets diktare 1956
 Marie! Madrid! 1956
 Solgömma 1957
 Helhet i snitt och vinklar 1957
 Ur min anteckningsbok 1958
 Batteristen 1959
 Livsens dag 1959
 Dödsens liv 1960
 På upptäcktsfärd i Ätradalen 1961
 Halländsk horisont 1962
 Månresa 1962
Solaglaning (1964)
 Jävlafora 1966
 Lasse i Gatan och andra Hallandssägner 1969
 Vart har folket tagit vägen? 1971
 Fabler och småstycken från öst och väst 1971
"Broadway Blend": Emigrantberättelser (1973)
 Vägakantspredikan 1975
 Ringen i djupet 1977
 Sacco och Vanzetti 1977
 Perspektiv på Kina 1980
 Vad är boxning? 1982
 Folkafora 1983

Awards 

 ABF:s litteraturpris 1957

Sources

Swedish writers
1916 births
1990 deaths
Swedish expatriates in the United States